Mario Piccinocchi (born 21 February 1995) is an Italian footballer who plays as a midfielder for Alcione.

Club career
On 29 June 2015 he was signed by Vicenza Calcio on a 2-year contract. On 7 July he was farmed to Swiss Super League side FC Lugano.

On 6 July 2016 Piccinocchi signed a new contract with Lugano.

On 15 July 2019, he signed a contract with the Serie B club Ascoli for the term of one year with an option to extend it for 2 more years.

On 4 February 2021, Piccinocchi joined Serie D club Seregno.

On 22 July 2021, he signed a three-year contract with Alcione in Serie D.

References

External links
 

1995 births
Living people
Italian footballers
Association football midfielders
FC Lugano players
Ascoli Calcio 1898 F.C. players
U.S. 1913 Seregno Calcio players
Swiss Super League players
Serie B players
Serie D players
Italy youth international footballers
Italian expatriate footballers
Italian expatriate sportspeople in Switzerland
Expatriate footballers in Switzerland